Fogging phenomenon in computerized tomography (CT) scanning of the head is vanishing signs of an infarct on the serial CT imaging in a patient with a recent stroke. It is a reversal of the hypodensity on the CT after an acute ischemic stroke. This happens as a result of re-nourishment of the infarcted area in subacute phase about one to three weeks after the stroke. In fact, resolution of the edema, which was caused by the accident, leads to increased attenuation of infarcted area that may regain near-normal density and mask the stroke. However, in the third week, parenchymal volume loss commonly appears as a hypoattenuation (decreased attenuation) with a negative mass effect (shrinkage).

References

Radiologic signs
Stroke